Faridkot is a city in the South-western part of state of Punjab, India. It serves as the headquarters for both, the Faridkot district. as well as the Faridkot Division. The division was established in 1995 at Faridkot which includes Faridkot, Bathinda and Mansa districts.

Etymology
The city is named in the honor of Baba Farid, a revered 13th century Sufi saint whose shrine is located in Pakpattan, Pakistan. The town of Faridkot was founded during this century as Mokalhar by Raja Mokalsi, the grandson of Rai Munj, a Bhatti Chief of Bhatnair, Rajasthan. According to a popular folklore, the Raja renamed Mokalhar to Faridkot after Baba Farid paid a visit to the town. It remained the capital during the reign of Mokalsi's son Jairsi and Wairsi.

History
The historic fort of Quila Mubarak exists since the times of Baba Farid. However, the foundation of the modern city as a princely state was laid in 1763 by Hamir Singh.Beginning in 1807, the city was briefly under the rule of Maharaja Ranjit Singh till 1809. It was restored to the reigning Brar family thorugh British intervention. The city continued as the capital of Faridkot State under British suzerainty till 1947.Later, it became a part of the Patiala & East Punjab States Union (PEPSU) in 1948. Faridkot was carved out as a separate district on 7 August 1972 out of the areas of erstwhile Bathinda District (Faridkot Tehsil) and Ferozepur District (Moga and Muktsar Tehsils). Further, in November 1995 the Faridkot District was trifurcated when two of its sub divisions viz. Muktsar and Moga were given the status of independent districts under the leadership of CM Harcharan Singh Brar of Muktsar

Government body
The Municipal Council Faridkot came into existence in the year 1948 and now has a Class -I status. Uma Grover is the current President of the council and Kushaldeep Singh Dhillon of Indian National Congress is the member of Legislative Assembly from the town elected in 2017.

Geography
The average elevation is 196 metres (643 ft). The town is located on the Punjab Plains, which in a macro regional context forms a part of greater Satluj Ganga plain. It is a low-lying flat area. The surface of the district is depositional plain which was formed by alleviation by the rivers flowing in these plains. Sirhind Feeder and Indira Gandhi Canal pass through the district.
The topography of the district is plain, with only 1.4% of its area under forest cover.

Demographics
 India census, Faridkot had a population of 618,008 which constitute about 2% of the total population of Punjab. Males constitute 327,121 of the population and females 290,887.The population density in this district is 424 persons per km2. Faridkot has an average literacy rate of 70.6%: male literacy is 75.9%, and female literacy is 64.8%.

Transport
Faridkot city is well connected by road through National Highway 54. Faridkot railway station, located in the city lies on Bhatinda - Firozpur line. Many trains connect Faridkot to other major cities in Punjab and other states. The nearest airport, Sri Guru Ram Dass Jee International Airport is located near Amritsar.

Climate
The climate of the Faridkot is mostly dry, characterized by a very hot summer, a short rainy season and a bracing winter. The cold season is from November to March. it is followed by the summer season which lasts up to the end of June. The period from July to the middle of September constitutes the southwest monsoon season. The later half of September and October is the post-monsoon or transition period. The temperature increases rapidly beginning with the end of March till June, which is the hottest month, with the mean daily minimum temperature about 41 °C and the mean daily minimum about 26.5 °C. The temperature is intensively hot during this period. The maximum temperature can go beyond 47 °C on some days. With the onset of the monsoon by the end of June or early July, there is an appreciable drop in the day temperature. After October, both the day and night temperatures decrease rapidly till January which is the coldest month. The mean daily maximum temperature in January is about 20 °C and the mean daily minimum about 4.5 °C.

The average annual rainfall in the district is 433mm; about 71 percent of the annual rainfall in the district is received during the monsoon months July to September. Some rainfall occurs during the pre-monsoon months, mostly in the form of thundershowers. Weather is moderately cloudy during the monsoon season. During the rest of the year the skies are mostly clear. Wind speed is normally slow and flows in north to northwest, some times in southeast direction, throughout the year.

Festival (Aagman Purab)
Every year, a festival is held to commemorate the arrival of Baba Farid in Faridkot. The festival is held for 3 days every year from 21–23 September. On 23 September, a grand parade departs from Tilla Baba Farid (Sikh Temple) and reaches Godari Sahib (Sikh Temple).

Tourism
 Gurudwara Tilla (Chilla) Baba Farid 
This Gurudwara is as old as the town itself. It is situated near Qilla Mubarak (Royal Fort). Baba Farid remained at this place in meditation for 40 days before proceeding to Pakpattan. A sacred piece of wood with which Sheikh Baba Farid wiped his hands littered with mud has been preserved in this temple. Shabad-Kirtan (Sikh hymns) are recited daily and Langer (large communal meal in Sikhism) is also served every day to the people visiting the temple.

 Gurdwara Godari Sahib 
This place is situated on the outskirts about 4 km on Faridkot-Kotkapura road. It is believed that Baba Sheikh Farid left his godari (jacket) there before entering Faridkot town. A gurdwara had been constructed in 1982 and a sarover (pond) was later constructed at this place.

Education
The city houses Baba Farid University of Health Sciences, which is the premier medical university of Punjab. Guru Gobind Singh Medical College and Hospital was established in the year 1973. Dasmesh Institute of Research & Dental Sciences is another medical school in the city. Government Brajindra College was set-up in 1942 and Desh Bhagat Pandit Chetan Dev Government College of Education established in 1945 by the Faridkot Royalty. Dasmesh Public School ,Faridkot, Baba Farid Public School, St. Mary's Convent School, Mount Litera Zee School, Dashmesh Global School, Baba Farid Law College, Delhi International School, Balbir School and Dr. Mohinder Brar Sambhi Government Girls Sr. Sec. School are prominent schools in the town besides several other educational institutes.
Kendriya Vidyalaya and New Model Sen. Sec School is also located in the town. Adesh institute of engineering and technology is also situated in the city.

There are 96 private English language schools in the city.

Hospitals
 Guru Gobind Singh Medical College, Faridkot
 Sant Baba Karnail Dass Medical Charitable Hospital, Vivek Ashram
 Dasmesh Institute of Research & Dental Sciences, Faridkot
 Civil Hospital, Faridkot
Madhu Nursing Home,Faridkot
 Balbir Hospital, Faridkot
 Preet Hospital, Faridkot
 Sukhmani hospital and heart care centre

Notable people
 Late Giani Zail Singh, Former President of India
 Mohinder Singh Romana
  Former president Takhat sri Patna sahib 

AAP Pb
 Muhammad Sadiq (singer), Member of Parliament
 Kushaldeep Singh Dhillon, former MLA
 Rupinder Pal Singh, Indian Hockey Player 

 Ihana Dhillon, Indian Actress

References

External links
Official website 
Faridkot district
Baba Farid University of Health Sciences,Faridkot
Govt. Brijindra college 
Dasmesh Institute Of Research And Dental Sciences, Faridkot
GOVT. INDUSTRIAL TRAINING INSTITUTE, FARIDKOT
BABA FARID LAW COLLEGE, FARIDKOT

 
1972 establishments in Punjab, India
Cities and towns in Faridkot district